Murder Plan Six is a 1958 thriller novel by the British writer John Bingham. It was released in the United States by Dodd Mead the following year.

Synopsis
A thriller writer reveals the plot of his latest novel to his publisher, who becomes concerned that it may be based on a real crime.

References

Bibliography
 Reilly, John M. Twentieth Century Crime & Mystery Writers. Springer, 2015.

1958 British novels
British thriller novels
Novels by John Bingham
Victor Gollancz Ltd books